The Focke-Wulf F 19 Ente (German: "Duck") was a German experimental "canard" aircraft in the late 1920s.

Design
The F 19 Ente was a high-wing monoplane with a canard layout and fixed tricycle undercarriage. The pilot sat in an open cockpit, while an enclosed cabin was provided for two or three passengers. The canard was mounted on short struts above the nose of the aircraft, ahead of the cockpit, and the two engines were housed in nacelles mounted under the wings.

The F 19 design was set so that the front stabilizer would stall some moments before the rear-mounted main wing, which in theory made the Ente virtually stall-proof.

Operational history
The first example flew on 2 September 1927 but was destroyed on 29 September during a demonstration of single-engine flight, after a control rod snapped. Focke-Wulf co-founder Georg Wulf was killed in the crash. Nevertheless, a second aircraft (D-1960) was built, flying in late 1930. This was used for a promotional tour of Europe the following year which took it to Denmark, Sweden, the Netherlands, Belgium, and the UK. On 7 November 1931, it was demonstrated at Hanworth Air Park, flown by Focke-Wulf chief pilot Cornelius Edzard.

Later, it was put on display at the Deutsche Luftfahrtsammlung in Berlin, where it was destroyed in an Allied air raid in 1944.

Specifications

Notes

References

External links

 "Plane That Flies Backwards Called Safest Craft", February 1931 rare photo in article
 1931 British Movietone newsreel film of Focke Wulf F 19 Ente taking off, flying, and landing
 The Tail First Plane (1931), British Pathé
 Photos and film of Focke Wulf F 19 Ente

1920s German civil utility aircraft
F 19
Canard aircraft
High-wing aircraft
Aircraft first flown in 1927
Twin piston-engined tractor aircraft